Vrhpolje (Врхпоље) is a village in Serbia. It is in the Municipality of Ljubovija, in the Mačva District of Central Serbia.

The village had a Serb ethnic majority and a population of 985 in 2002.  Vrhpolje is on the bank of the Drina River.

Historical population
1948: 1,369
1953: 1,378
1961: 1,389
1971: 1,201
1981: 1,201
1991: 1,034
2002: 985

References

See also
List of places in Serbia

Populated places in Mačva District
Ljubovija